Aydar is a rural locality (a selo) and the administrative center of Aydarskoye Rural Settlement, Rovensky District, Belgorod Oblast, Russia. The population was 1,183 as of 2010. There are 12 streets.

Geography 
Aydar is located 19 km north of Rovenki (the district's administrative centre) by road. Staraya Raygorodka and Fomina are the nearest rural localities.

References 

Rural localities in Rovensky District, Belgorod Oblast